"Mother" is a song by English musician John Lennon, first released on his 1970 album John Lennon/Plastic Ono Band. An edited version of the song was issued as a single in the United States on Apple Records, on 28 December 1970. The single edit runs 1:41 shorter than the album due to removing the tolling bells that start the song and a quicker fade-out. The B-side features "Why" by Yoko Ono. The song peaked in the United States at number 19 on the Cashbox Top 100 and number 43 on the Billboard Hot 100.

Conception
The lyrics of "Mother" address both of Lennon's parents, each of whom abandoned him in his childhood. His father, Alf, left the family when John was an infant. His mother, Julia, did not live with her son, although they had a good relationship; she was hit and killed in a car accident on 15 July 1958 by an off-duty policeman named Eric Clague, when Lennon was 17. In one of his last concerts, Lennon stated that the song was not just about his parents, but was rather "about 99% of the parents, alive or half dead".

"Mother" opens the album, starting with a funeral bell tolling slowly, four times. The song ends with Lennon repeating the phrase "Mama don't go, daddy come home", each time increasing in intensity until he screams the line as the song fades out.

Lennon was inspired to write the song after undergoing primal therapy with Arthur Janov, originally at his home at Tittenhurst Park and then at the Primal Institute, California, where he remained for four months. Lennon, who eventually derided Janov, initially described the therapy as "something more important to me than The Beatles".

Although Lennon said that "Mother" was the song that "seemed to catch in my head," he had doubts about its commercial appeal and he considered issuing "Love" as a single instead. In November 1982, a remixed version of "Love" was released as a single to help promote The John Lennon Collection LP.

An early version of "Mother" performed on an electric guitar by Lennon can be heard on the John Lennon Anthology box set.

A demo version of the song was featured in the final scene and credits of the 2009 John Lennon biographical film, Nowhere Boy.

Reception
Cash Box said of the single version that "spare production work and a powerful melancholy vocal give the [song] its disturbing brilliance."

Personnel
The musicians who performed on the original recording were as follows:
John Lennon – double-tracked vocals, guitars, piano
Yoko Ono – wind
Ringo Starr – drums
Klaus Voormann – bass guitar

Lennon plays guitar rather than piano on the Nowhere Boy demo version.

Other versions
Barbra Streisand recorded "Mother" (as well as Lennon's "Love") on her 1971 album Barbra Joan Streisand; it was also released as a single. The song also featured on Lennon's live album Live in New York City, released by Lennon's widow Yoko Ono after his death. Other songs born out of this period of therapy include "Working Class Hero" and "Isolation".
Shigesato Itoi, creator of the Mother video game series, stated in an interview that this song was in large part the inspiration for his naming of the series.
Mia Martini recorded in 1972 this song in Italian, with the title literally translated as "Madre".
Maynard Ferguson recorded the song on his 1972 album M.F. Horn Two.
South African artist Ratau Mike Makhalemele covered the song on an EP of Lennon covers in 1990.
Shelby Lynne covered this song on her 2001 album Love, Shelby. 
Christina Aguilera covered the song in 2007 for the benefit album Instant Karma: The Amnesty International Campaign to Save Darfur.
Folk artist Jackie Oates included a version of the song on her 2018 album The Joy of Living.
Lou Reed covered the song several times live featuring electric guitars and violins.
David Bowie recorded the song as a demo, posthumously released on 8 January 2021.

See also
 "My Mummy's Dead", another song by Lennon

References

1970s ballads
1970 singles
Apple Records singles
Barbra Streisand songs
Christina Aguilera songs
John Lennon songs
Rock ballads
Song recordings produced by John Lennon
Song recordings produced by Phil Spector
Song recordings produced by Yoko Ono
Songs about childhood
Commemoration songs
Songs written by John Lennon
Plastic Ono Band songs